Ian Rogers may refer to:

Ian Rogers (chess player) (born 1960), Australian chess grandmaster
Ian Rogers (rugby referee) (1957–1998), South African rugby referee
Ian Rogers (singer), singer, member of band Still Pending
Ian Rogers (writer) (born 1976), Canadian supernatural and horror writer
Ian Rogers (comics), a Marvel Comics character